The Pilot is the official newspaper of the Archdiocese of Boston and claims the title of "America's Oldest Catholic Newspaper", having been in continuous publication since its first issue on September 5, 1829.  Although the first Catholic newspaper in the United States, The United States Catholic Miscellany of Charleston, South Carolina, was founded seven years earlier in 1822, it ceased publication in 1861.

The paper was founded by Bishop Benedict Joseph Fenwick, the second bishop of Boston, at a time of increased Irish immigration to the United States and rising anti-Catholic animus to the newcomers' church. In its first edition, Bishop Fenwick wrote that the newspaper's purpose was to defend against the "crying calumnies and gross misrepresentations which in this section of the country have been so long, so unsparingly, so cruelly heaped upon the Church."

In 1834, Fenwick sold the publication to two laymen—Henry Devereux, the publisher, and Patrick Donahoe, an employee who quickly became the newspaper's sole proprietor. In 1838, Donahoe became editor, and he maintained control of the newspaper until his death in 1891. During much of the 19th century, The Pilot acquired a reputation of being an Irish-American cultural newspaper.  The great majority of Boston's Catholics were originally immigrants from Ireland, with tens of thousands arriving during and after the Great Famine.  Notable editors linked to the movement for Irish independence include John Boyle O'Reilly, James Jeffrey Roche and Thomas D'Arcy McGee.

Archbishop William Henry O'Connell purchased the paper in 1908 and turned it into the official voice of Boston's archdiocese. He closely monitored its editorial policies and sought to promote its readership among local Catholic families. In 1979, The Pilot celebrated its 150th anniversary and featured special information about the newspaper's history. As of 2004, its circulation was of 23,039 printed copies.

In 2006, the newspaper launched its online edition, TheBostonPilot.com, which offers expanded content and multimedia features.

Titles
Beginning as The Jesuit or Catholic Sentinel, the newspaper's name was changed several times in its first seven years. Titles included The Jesuit, The United States Catholic Intelligencer, and The Literary and Catholic Sentinel. By 1836, Patrick Donahoe changed the name of the newspaper to The Boston Pilot, partly in tribute to the Dublin Pilot.

In 1858, the newspaper's Old English nameplate The Pilot appeared for the first time, under the editorship of Father Joseph M. Finotti, along with the motto, "Be just and fear not, let all the ends thou aim'st at be thy God's, thy Country's and Truth's". Despite the fact that the name The Pilot and its logo have remained essentially unchanged for over 150 years, it is not uncommon for the newspaper to be referred to as The Boston Pilot to this day.

References

Further reading
 Evans, Anthony G. Fanatic Heart: A Life of John Boyle O'Reilly, 1844-1890 (Northeastern University Press, 1997)
 McManamin, Francis G. The American Years of John Boyle O'Reilly 1870-1890 (Kessinger, 2006.)

External links
Official website
The Pilot, Archdiocese of Boston Official Website
"Information Wanted", A Database of Advertisements for Irish Immigrants Published in the Boston Pilot

Catholic newspapers published in the United States
Publications established in 1829
Irish-American culture in Boston
1829 establishments in Massachusetts
Irish-American press